Vladan Đorđević ( born January 10, 1983, in Ćuprija, SR Serbia, Yugoslavia) is a Serbian volleyball player (outside hitter). He started playing volleyball in OK Morava. He played 75 matches for the junior national team and 60 matches for the senior national team. He was a member of the national team representing Serbia and Montenegro at the 2004 Summer Olympics in Athens.

Career 
 1995–1998   OK Morava
 1998–2004   OK Partizan
 2004–2005   HotVolley's
 2005   Nikea
 2006   Pagrati
 2006-2007   Galatasaray
 2007–2008   SGK Voleybol İhtisas Kulübü
 2008–2009   OK Ribnica
 2009–2010   OK Partizan
 2010–2011   Baniyas – Abu Dhabi
 2011–2012   OK Radnički Kragujevac
 2012–2013   OK Jagodina
 2013—2015   Anagennisi Deryneias
2015-2016  APOEL
 2016  Pomgrad Murska Sobota
 2017  Vllaznia Skodra
 2017-2018  OK Spartak Ljig
 2018  OK Mladost Brčko
 2019  Partizani Tirana
 2019-2020  OK Partizan

External links
 
 Vladan Đorđević – volley trend

1983 births
Living people
People from Ćuprija
Serbian men's volleyball players
Serbia and Montenegro men's volleyball players
Olympic volleyball players of Serbia and Montenegro
Volleyball players at the 2004 Summer Olympics
Serbian expatriate sportspeople in Australia
Serbian expatriate sportspeople in Greece
Serbian expatriate sportspeople in Turkey
Serbian expatriate sportspeople in the United Arab Emirates
Serbian expatriate sportspeople in Cyprus
Galatasaray S.K. (men's volleyball) players